Hans Bentzien (1927–2015) was a German writer and politician who served as the culture minister of East Germany from 1961 to 1966. Being a member of the ruling party Socialist Unity Party (SED), he held several political and public posts in East Germany.

Early life and education
Bentzien was born in Greifswald, Germany, on 4 January 1927. He became a member of the Nazi Party in 1944. He joined the German Army and fought in World War II. He was arrested by the British forces in 1945. Following his release he joined the SED in 1946. 

Bentzien graduated from the University of Greifswald and the University of Jena obtaining a degree in history. He also studied history and social sciences in Moscow between 1955 and 1958.

Career
Bentzien worked as a teacher in his hometown between 1946 and 1948. He was assistant to the director of culture in VEB Carl Zeiss in Jena. Then he became the first secretary of the SED in Jena-Stadt and was the secretary for culture and popular education of the SED from 1954 to 1955. He served as the secretary for culture and education of the SED in Halle between 1958 and 1961.

He was appointed culture minister in 1961, replacing Alexander Abusch in the post. Bentzien was removed from office in January 1966 due to the alleged violation of the rules of the SED. The reason for his removal was the publication of several writings in Neue Deutsche Literatur (German: New German Literature) which supported views opposite to the position of the SED. In the same move Kurt Turba, head of the youth commission at the Politburo of the SED's Central Committee, was also fired. 

Then Bentzien was made the publishing director of a publishing house, Neues Leben, which he held between 1966 and 1975. In 1975 he was appointed deputy chairman of the state committee for television and served in the post until 1979 when he was dismissed. In the period between 1 December 1989 and 13 June 1990 he served as the television manager of East Germany. He was succeeded by Michael Albert in the post.

Work
Bentzien wrote several television plays and published some books on history.

Death
Bentzien died in Bad Saarow, Germany, on 18 May 2015.

References

External links

20th-century German writers
1927 births
2015 deaths
Government ministers of East Germany
German Army personnel of World War II
German prisoners of war in World War II held by the United Kingdom
Socialist Unity Party of Germany politicians
University of Greifswald alumni
University of Jena alumni
People from Greifswald
Nazi Party members